Functional regression is a version of regression analysis when responses or covariates include functional data. Functional regression models can be classified into four types depending on whether the responses or covariates are functional or scalar: (i) scalar responses with functional covariates, (ii) functional responses with scalar covariates, (iii) functional responses with functional covariates, and (iv) scalar or functional responses with functional and scalar covariates. In addition, functional regression models can be linear, partially linear, or nonlinear. In particular, functional polynomial models, functional single and multiple index models and functional additive models are three special cases of functional nonlinear models.



Functional linear models (FLMs) 
Functional linear models (FLMs) are an extension of linear models (LMs). A linear model with scalar response  and scalar covariates  can be written as

FLMs can be divided into two types based on the responses.

Functional linear models with scalar responses 
Functional linear models with scalar responses can be obtained by replacing the scalar covariates  and the coefficient vector  in model by a centered functional covariate  and a coefficient function  with domain , respectively, and replacing the inner product in Euclidean space by that in Hilbert space ,

For implementation, regularization is needed and can be done through truncation,  penalization or  penalization.

Adding multiple functional and scalar covariates, model can be extended to

However, due to the parametric component , the estimation methods for model cannot be used in this case and alternative estimation methods for model are available.

Functional linear models with functional responses 
For a functional response  with domain  and a functional covariate  with domain , two FLMs regressing  on  have been considered. One of these two models is of the form

An estimating equation motivated by multivariate linear regression is

Regularization is needed and can be done through truncation,  penalization or  penalization. Various estimation methods for model are available.
A simpler version of the historical functional linear model is the functional concurrent model (see below).
Adding multiple functional covariates, model can be extended to

In particular, taking  as a constant function yields a special case of model

which is a FLM with functional responses and scalar covariates.

Functional concurrent models 
Assuming that , another model, known as the functional concurrent model, sometimes also referred to as the varying-coefficient model, is of the form

Various estimation methods can be applied to model.
Adding multiple functional covariates, model can also be extended to

Functional nonlinear models

Functional polynomial models 
Functional polynomial models are an extension of the FLMs with scalar responses, analogous to extending linear regression to polynomial regression. For a scalar response  and a functional covariate  with domain , the simplest example of functional polynomial models is functional quadratic regression

Functional single and multiple index models 
A functional multiple index model is given by

Taking  yields a functional single index model. With  and relatively small sample sizes, the estimator given by this model often has large variance. An alternative -component functional multiple index model can be expressed as

Estimation methods for functional single and multiple index models are available.

Functional additive models (FAMs) 
Given an expansion of a functional covariate  with domain  in an orthonormal basis : , a functional linear model with scalar responses shown in model can be written as

Another form of FAMs consists of a sequence of time-additive models:

Extensions 
A direct extension of FLMs with scalar responses shown in model is to add a link function to create a generalized functional linear model (GFLM) by analogy to extending linear regression to generalized linear regression (GLM), of which the three components are:
 Linear predictor ;
 Variance function , where  is the conditional mean;
 Link function  connecting the conditional mean and the linear predictor through .

See also 
 Functional data analysis
 Functional principal component analysis
 Karhunen–Loève theorem
 Generalized functional linear model
 Stochastic processes

References 

Regression analysis